Pitcairnia trianae is a species of flowering plant in the Bromeliaceae family. It is native to Bolivia and Ecuador.

References

trianae
Flora of Bolivia
Flora of Ecuador
Taxa named by Édouard André